Ministry of culture may refer to:

Ministry of Tourism, Cultural Affairs, Youth and Sports (Albania)
Ministry of Culture (Algeria)
Ministry of Culture (Argentina)
Minister for the Arts (Australia)
Ministry of Culture (Azerbaijan)
Ministry of Youth, Sports and Culture (Bahamas)
Ministry of Citizenship (Brazil)
Ministry of Culture (Brazil)
Ministry of Culture, Youth and Sports (Brunei)
Ministry of Culture (Burma)
Ministry of Home and Cultural Affairs (Bhutan)
Ministry of Culture and Fine Arts (Cambodia)
Minister of Canadian Heritage
Ministry of Tourism and Culture (Ontario) (result of merger of Ministry of Culture (Ontario))
Ministry of Culture (Cape Verde)
Ministry of Culture (Bulgaria)
Ministry of Culture and Tourism (China)
Home Affairs Bureau (Hong Kong)
Secretariat for Social Affairs and Culture (Macau)
Ministry of Culture (Colombia)
Ministry of Culture (Croatia)
Ministry of Culture (Czech Republic)
Ministry of Culture (Denmark)
Ministry of Higher Education, Science and Culture (East Timor)
Ministry of Culture (Egypt)
Ministry of Culture (Estonia)
Ministry of Culture and Tourism (Ethiopia)
Minister of Culture (France)
Ministry of Culture and Tourism (Greece)
Ministry of Culture and Communication (Haiti)
Ministry of Culture, Arts and Sports (Honduras)
Minister of Education of Hungary
Minister of Education, Science and Culture (Iceland)
Ministry of Education, Culture, Research, and Technolog (Indonesia)
Ministry of Culture (India)
Ministry of Culture and Islamic Guidance (Iran)
Minister for Tourism, Culture, Arts, Gaeltacht, Sport and Media (Ireland)
Ministry of Culture and Sports (Israel)
Minister for Cultural Assets and Activities (Italy)
Minister of Education, Culture, Sports, Science and Technology (Japan)
Ministry of Culture (Jordan)
Ministry of Culture (Kazakhstan)
Ministry of Culture, Information and Tourism (Kyrgyz Republic)
Ministry of Culture (Lithuania)
Ministry of Culture (Lebanon)
Ministry of Culture (Republic of Macedonia)
Minister of Tourism, Arts and Culture (Malaysia)
Secretariat of Culture, Mexico
Ministry of Culture (Moldova)
Ministry of Culture (Montenegro)
Ministry of Culture (Morocco)
Ministry of Religious Affairs and Culture (Myanmar)
Ministry of Education, Culture and Science (Netherlands)
Ministry for Culture and Heritage (New Zealand)
Federal Ministry of Information and Culture (Nigeria)
Ministry of Culture and Tourism (Rivers State)
Minister of Culture (North Korea)
Ministry of Culture (Norway)
Ministry of Culture (Peru)
Minister of Culture and National Heritage (Poland)
Ministry of Culture (Portugal)
Ministry of Culture, Arts and Heritage (Qatar)
Ministry of Culture (Romania)
Ministry of Culture (Russia)
Ministry of Culture  (Saudi Arabia)
Ministry of Information, Communications and the Arts (Singapore)
Ministry of Culture (Slovakia)
Ministry of Culture (Slovenia)
Minister of Arts and Culture (South Africa)
Ministry of Culture, Sports and Tourism (South Korea)
Ministry of Culture (Spain)
Ministry of Culture (Sweden)
Ministry of Culture (Syria)
Ministry of Culture (Taiwan)
Ministry of Culture (Thailand)
Ministry of Culture and Tourism (Turkey)
Ministry of Culture (Tunisia)
Ministry of Culture (Turkmenistan)
Ministry of Culture & Youth (United Arab Emirates)
Department for Digital, Culture, Media and Sport (United Kingdom)
Secretary of State for Digital, Culture, Media and Sport (United Kingdom)
Parliamentary Under Secretary of State for Arts, Heritage and Tourism (United Kingdom)
Minister of Culture, Arts and Leisure (Northern Ireland)
Cabinet Secretary for Culture and External Affairs (Scotland)
Minister for Housing, Regeneration and Heritage (Wales)
 Ministry of Culture, Sports and Tourism (Vietnam)

References